The Pico Piedras Blancas (also known as Misamán), at , is the highest mountain of the Sierra de la Culata range in the Mérida State, and the fifth-highest mountain in Venezuela. Its name, meaning "White Stones", is of uncertain origin, since the massif is predominantly grey in color. Pico Piedras Blancas lacks glaciers; however, seasonal snowfalls may briefly cover its flanks. From its summit and under clear conditions, Lake Maracaibo can be seen. One of the accesses to reach the base of the mountain, is through the Mifafí Condor Reserve, which hosts some specimens of this andean bird.

Location

Elevation 

A former measure of 4,762 metres, given by Jahn in 1910, was corrected to 4,737 metres in 1951. The latter measure was confirmed by a 2002 GPS survey.

Climbing
Though being the highest mountain of the Sierra de la Culata, it is not as frequently climbed as Pico Pan de Azucar in the same range of La Culata or the highest peaks of the Sierra Nevada de Mérida range. 

 Piedras Blancas can be best climbed during the dry season, from October to March
 The principal accesses are two: through the Mifafí Condor Reserve, near Casa de Gobierno in the Trasandina road, and through the town of La Toma, nearby Mucuchíes, also in the Trasandina road
 The normal route is through the eastern side of the massif

References 

 Silva, Gustavo (2001). "Los Picos más altos del Estado Mérida-Venezuela". Rev. Geog. Venez. 42 (1)
 Pérez, O; Hoyer, M; Hernández, J; Rodrígez, C; Márques, V; Sué, N; Velandia, J; Deiros, D (2005). "Alturas del Pico Bolívar y otras cimas andinas venezolanas a partir de observaciones GPS". Interciencia. 30 (4). 
 "Determinan la altura exacta del Pico Bolívar" (2003). Instituto Geográfico de Venezuela Simón Bolívar. IGVSB-BG No 14. 
 Laffaille, Jaime. "Las montañas que lloran".

Notes

Mountains of Venezuela
Geography of Mérida (state)